The European route E 314 is a road in Europe and a part of the United Nations International E-road network.

Three Nations
For most of its length the E 314 is in Belgium where it tracks the A2.   It then crosses briefly into Dutch Limburg, the most southerly province of The Netherlands before an even briefer stretch between the Dutch-German frontier and Aachen:  the German section tracks the start of the Autobahn A 4, which continues beyond Aachen all the way to Görlitz.

In Belgium the road is of standard autoroute quality with two lanes in each direction.   The Dutch section includes a short six lane section but also the only part of the E 314 of sub-autoroute quality, though even here the road uses a dual carriageway lay-out.

Highlights of the route
 Between the end points, the road also serves the industrial city of Genk where Ford once built their Mondeo model.   The Belgian section continues through the Hoge Kempen National Park:  in 2005 the Kikbeek Ecoduct was opened here, whereby the road runs through a short tunnel section above which wild life has space to cross the road in relative safety.

The Dutch section is noteworthy for the sight of a large chemical plant shortly after crossing the frontier from Belgium.   In the Netherlands, near to Heerlen, the E 414 also crosses the Dutch A2 Highway, a major artery of the Dutch roadway network, connecting nearby Maastricht with the heart of the country and Amsterdam.

Language changes
The area covered by this road has historically been at the border of three different linguistic regions.  Place names on the E 314 will be known to English speakers by different names according to when it was adopted into English language. Most known at the eastern end of the road is Aachen still known to English speakers (and in their nineteenth century literature)  by its French name as "Aix" or "Aix-la-Chapelle", while road signs in Belgian Limburg eventually still mention the Dutch name "Aken".

At the western end of the road Leuven is located in the Dutch speaking region, although in foreign (French, English, German ...) maps or literature "Louvain" (which has never been the city's official name) may still appear.

The route

External links 
 UN Economic Commission for Europe: Overall Map of E-road Network (2007)

399314
E314
E314
E314